The 2016 Big East Conference women's soccer tournament is the postseason women's soccer tournament for the Big East Conference to be held from November 1 to 6, 2016. The five-match tournament will begin with first round matches held at campus sites, before moving to Shaw Field in Washington, D.C. for the semifinals and final. The six team single-elimination tournament will consist of three rounds based on seeding from regular season conference play. The Butler Bulldogs are the defending tournament champions, after defeating the Providence Friars in the championship match, claiming their first Big East championship in any sport since joining in 2013–14.

Bracket

Schedule

Quarterfinals

Semifinals

Final

References 
2016 Big East Women's Soccer Championship

 
Big East Conference Women's Soccer Tournament